The Ghost Army is a 2013 American documentary about the United States Army 23rd Headquarters Special Troops, produced and directed by Rick Beyer.

Synopsis
The documentary tells the history of the secret U.S. Army unit of 1,100 troops that was set up in 1944 and operated until 1945 in the final stages of World War II in the fight against German troops in various parts of Europe. They used a combination of different ways of visual, sonic and radio deception to convince the enemy of the presence of specific Army units that were in fact operating elsewhere.

The unit included a large number of visual artists and designers who documented their experiences in paintings and sketches. The material employed in the 23rd Army Headquarters Special Troops' operations included decoys such as inflatable rubber tanks and jeeps as well as powerful loudspeaker trucks playing sound recordings of troop activity.

Interviews
 General Wesley Clark - Military and historical analysis
 Peter Coyote - Narrator
 Ed Biow - Private Camouflage Unit
 John Jarvie - Corporal Camouflage Unit
 Victor Dowd - Sergeant Camouflage Unit
 Jack Masey - Corporal Camouflage Unit
 Arthur Shilstone - Corporal Camouflage Unit
 Gil Seltzer - Lieutenant Camouflage Unit
 Joe Spence - Private Camouflage Unit
 Jack McGlynn - Sergeant Sonic Unit
 Harold Flinn - Private Sonic Unit
 Al Albrecht - Corporal Sonic Unit
 Spike Berry - Sergeant Radio Unit
 John Gawne - Author of Ghosts of the ETO
 Stan Nance - Sergeant Radio Unit
 Irving Stempel - Corporal Camouflage Unit
 Bernie Mason - Lieutenant Camouflage Unit
 Dick Syracuse- Lieutenant Sonic Unit
 Bob Tompkins - Sergeant Camouflage Unit

Archival footage
 Dwight Eisenhower
  Amelia Earhart

Exhibition
The film first premiered at the Salem Film Festival on March 7, 2013.  It was shown on PBS on May 21, 2013. It had its European Theatrical Premiere at the Abbaye de Neumünster in Luxembourg on November 27, 2013.

Film Festivals
 Salem Film Festival
 GI Film Festival
 International Historical and Military Film Festival
 Moab Film Festival
 CineSol Film Festival

Awards
Wins
 CINE Golden Eagle: Televised Documentary/History
 Salem Film Festival: Audience Award
 Moab Film Festival: Audience Appeal Award

Critical Reaction
The Ghost Army received overwhelmingly positive reviews. On Metacritic 79 out of 100. 
David Weigand at the San Francisco Chronicle called it a "mesmerizing documentary," going on to say: "You could call it a kind of World War II version of Argo and it makes for a documentary that is almost as gripping as Ben Affleck's film." Robert Lloyd at The Los Angeles Times called it "fascinating, detailed and oddly delightful." Matt Roush of TV Guide called it "remarkable and memorable…first-rate…entrancing." Dorothy Rabinowitz of the Wall Street Journal commented: "The unit's work was top secret, its members' experiences, recounted in this film, fascinating above all for what they tell about the determined inventiveness, the all-out ambition to try everything, characteristic of that war effort." Washington Post and New York Daily News critics both called the documentary "fascinating."

Mark Feeney at the Boston Globe praised the film while offering a rare note of criticism: "The Ghost Army" can feel a bit padded at times. Like one of those rubber tanks, it's not as imposing as it seems. But also like those tanks, it's memorable and not quite like anything else."

Feature film adaptation
On June 15, 2015, Warner Bros acquired the film adaptation rights to Breyer's novel with Henry Gayden writing the script, and Bradley Cooper, Todd Phillips and Andrew Lazar producing the film. On April 23, 2019, Universal Pictures acquired the project, with Affleck attached to direct, produce, and potentially star in the film with Madison Ainsley and Lazar, and Nic Pizzolatto set to write the script.

See also
 Ghost Army
 List of World War II documentary films
 :Category:World War II deception operations

References

External links
 The Ghost Army Official Web Site
 
  (producer's YouTube Channel)
 Garber, Megan. "Ghost Army: The Inflatable Tanks That Fooled Hitler", The Atlantic, May 22, 2013.
 The Ghost Army of World War II, Princeton Architectural Press, 2015.

2013 films
2013 in American television
2013 documentary films
American documentary films
Documentary films about World War II
2013 independent films
American independent films
Military deception during World War II
2010s English-language films
2010s American films